WWE TLC: Tables, Ladders & Chairs was a professional wrestling event produced by WWE, a Connecticut-based promotion. It was broadcast live and available only through pay-per-view (PPV) and the WWE Network. The event was established in 2009, replacing Armageddon in the December slot of WWE's pay-per-view calendar. In 2017, the event was moved to October, but returned to December in 2018. An event was scheduled for 2021, but it was canceled in favor of a New Year's Day event called Day 1. The concept of the TLC event was based on the primary matches of the card each containing a stipulation using tables, ladders, and/or chairs as legal weapons, with the main event generally contested as a Tables, Ladders, and Chairs match.

The event was established during the first WWE brand extension, and the inaugural event featured wrestlers from the Raw, SmackDown, and ECW brands. Following ECW's disbandment in 2010, the 2010 TLC event only featured Raw and SmackDown before the first brand extension ended in August 2011. The brand split was reinstated in 2016, and TLC that year was exclusively a SmackDown-branded event. In 2017, it was held exclusively for Raw. Following WrestleMania 34 in 2018, brand-exclusive pay-per-views were discontinued, thus the 2018 event featured the Raw, SmackDown, and 205 Live brands, while the final two events only featured Raw and SmackDown.

The 2013 TLC event was notable as it saw the unification of the WWE Championship and World Heavyweight Championship, where Randy Orton defeated John Cena in a TLC match to unify the titles as the WWE World Heavyweight Championship; the unified title continued the lineage of the WWE Championship, and following the 2016 event, the title reverted to the shortened name. The 2018 event saw the first-ever women's three-way TLC match, which was also the first time that the SmackDown Women's Championship was defended in the main event match of a PPV, while the 2019 event saw the first women's tag team TLC match, which was also the first time that the WWE Women's Tag Team Championship was defended in the main event match of a PPV.

History
From 1999 to 2008 (except in 2001), World Wrestling Entertainment (WWE, which became an orphaned initialism in 2011) ran a pay-per-view (PPV) event titled Armageddon, and it was held in December. In 2009, the company decided to replace Armageddon with a new PPV. In August that year, WWE ran a poll on their website to allow fans to vote on the concept of this PPV, with the choices being an event themed around street fight main events, an event featuring a single-elimination tournament, and an event featuring matches that contained stipulations using tables, ladders, and/or chairs as legal weapons with the main event being a Tables, Ladders, and Chairs (TLC) match. The concept of a TLC-themed event was chosen and the event was aptly named TLC: Tables, Ladders & Chairs. The first event was then held on December 13, 2009, in San Antonio, Texas at the AT&T Center. A second event was held the following year, thus establishing TLC as an annual event for the promotion.

In 2014, WWE launched their online streaming service, the WWE Network, and in addition to traditional PPV, these events also began to air on the streaming service. The 2014 event was in turn the first TLC to air on the WWE Network. The 2014 event also had an alternative title of "Tables, Ladders, Chairs... and Stairs" as the event contained a Steel Stairs match in addition to the event's themed matches. In 2017, the event was moved to the October slot of WWE's PPV calendar, however, it returned to December in 2018 due to the cancellation of that year's Clash of Champions event. As a result of the COVID-19 pandemic that began affecting the industry in March 2020, WWE had to hold its events behind closed doors. The 2020 event was in turn held in WWE's bio-secure bubble called the WWE ThunderDome, hosted at Tropicana Field in St. Petersburg, Florida. Subsequently, it was the first WWE pay-per-view and WWE Network event presented from the ThunderDome at Tropicana Field, as the ThunderDome was previously hosted at the Amway Center in Orlando, Florida.

The 2021 TLC was canceled due to the scheduling of an event titled Day 1 that took place on January 1, 2022. Wrestling journalist Dave Meltzer reported that TLC, which was scheduled for December 19, 2021, was canceled to allow WWE to focus on Day 1 after November's Survivor Series. There would have also only been two weeks between TLC and Day 1, followed by the Royal Rumble in late January. In October 2021, WWE revealed their PPV calendar for 2022 and TLC was not included, thus TLC was discontinued.

To coincide with the WWE brand extension, in which the company divided its roster into brands where wrestlers exclusively performed, the inaugural event featured wrestlers from the Raw, SmackDown, and ECW brands. It would be the only TLC event to feature the ECW brand as that brand was disbanded in February 2010. The 2010 event would be the last held under the first brand extension, as in August 2011, the first brand extension was dissolved. In mid-2016, the brand split was reintroduced, and the 2016 event was held exclusively for wrestlers from the SmackDown brand, while the 2017 event was in turn held exclusively for Raw. Following WrestleMania 34 in 2018, brand-exclusive PPVs were discontinued, thus the 2018 event featured Raw, SmackDown, and 205 Live, while the final two events featured only Raw and SmackDown after 205 Live merged under NXT in September 2019.

Concept
The concept of this pay-per-view was that the main event matches were generally contested as a Tables, Ladders, and Chairs match, while the undercard matches would typically feature tables matches, ladder matches, and chairs matches. At the 2010 event, every match except one involved tables, ladders, or chairs. The 2014 event also included a steel stairs match, where the steel stairs could be used as a legal weapon.

In a tables match, the only way to win is for a wrestler to put their opponent through a table. In a ladder match, the only way to win is to climb a ladder and retrieve an item hanging above the center of the ring (for example, a championship belt). In a chairs match, only chairs can be used as legal weapons, but the only way to win is by pinfall or submission in the ring. In a Tables, Ladders, and Chairs match, all three are allowed to be used as legal weapons and there are no count-outs, but it has a couple of ways to win depending on if it is a championship match or not. In a non-title TLC match, the only way of winning is by pinfall or submission, while in a championship TLC match, the only way to win is the same as a regular ladder match.

Notable TLC matches
With the event's TLC theme, some of the TLC matches over the event's history were notable for the company as a whole. Following the dissolution of the first brand extension in August 2011, the company no longer had a need for two world championships. After two years, this matter would be settled at the 2013 TLC event. In the main event, reigning WWE Champion Randy Orton faced reigning World Heavyweight Champion John Cena in a title unification match that was contested as a TLC match. Orton would defeat Cena to unify the titles as the WWE World Heavyweight Championship, which continued the lineage of the WWE Championship while the World Heavyweight Championship was retired; immediately after the 2016 TLC event, the title reverted to being called WWE Championship.

In the midst of WWE's "Women's Evolution", which began in 2016 and saw female performers begin to be treated on an equal level as the men, the 2018 event saw the first-ever women's three-way TLC match, which was the first time that the SmackDown Women's Championship was defended in the main event of a PPV. This was followed up at the 2019 event, which saw the first women's tag team TLC match, which was also the first time that the WWE Women's Tag Team Championship was defended in the main event match of a PPV.

Events

See also
 Tables, Ladders, and Chairs match

References

External links

 
Recurring events established in 2009